Stevie D is a 2016 comedycrime drama film directed and written by Chris Cordone. The film stars Torrey DeVitto, Kevin Chapman, John Aprea, Spencer Garrett and Chris Cordone. Shot in Los Angeles and Palm Springs, it was released on February 25, 2016. The film's writer and director Chris Cordone plays the titular character Stevie D.

Plot 
Stevie D (Chris Cordone) is the son of a developer, Angelo (John Aprea). Stevie D accidentally kills the son of a crime boss, Nick (Al Sapienza) and Nick decides to seek revenge. His plan is to hire two hitmen, Big Lou and Little Dom (Phil Idrissi and Darren Capozzi) to kill Stevie D in front of his father. Angelo then hires an actor who looks surprisingly similar to his son to pretend to be Stevie-D until Nick gets his revenge. The actor, Michael, starts to live his new life as Stevie D with all the perks of dating Stevie’s women, driving his cars and spending his money.

Cast 

 Chris Cordone as Stevie D / Michael Rose
Torrey DeVitto as Daria Laurentis
 Kevin Chapman as Lenny
 John Aprea as Angelo DiMarco
 Spencer Garrett as Jack Laurentis
 Al Sapienza as Nick Grimaldi
 Robert Costanzo as Tony Muccerino
 Hal Linden as Max Levine
 Phil Idrissi as Big Lou
 Darren Capozzi as Little Don
Guy Camilleri as Agent Harris
Jason E. Kelley as Agent Shields
Alma Martinez as Senator Garcia
Alex Fernandez as Mayor Arturo Lopez
Seth Cassell as Johnny

Release 
The film was released on February 25, 2016 at Sedona International Film Festival.

Reception 
The film received mixed reviews from critics. Katie Walsh of Los Angeles Times said that "at nearly two hours it stretches the conceit and the performers far beyond their range". Hollywood Reporter's Sheri Linden praised the film's casting and especially Kevin Chapman's performance in the role of Lenny.

Awards

References

External links 

2010s crime comedy-drama films
American crime comedy-drama films
Films about criminals
2016 films
2010s English-language films
2010s American films